Morland is a civil parish in the Eden District, Cumbria, England. It contains 13 listed buildings that are recorded in the National Heritage List for England. Of these, one is listed at Grade I, the highest of the three grades, one is at Grade II*, the middle grade, and the others are at Grade II, the lowest grade.  The parish contains the village of Morland and the surrounding countryside.  Most of the listed buildings are in the village, and they consist of houses and associated structures, farmhouses and farm buildings, and a church and associated structures.  Outside the village the listed buildings are a house, a barn, and a bridge.


Key

Buildings

Notes and references

Notes

Citations

Sources

Lists of listed buildings in Cumbria